Gheorghe Panaiteanu Bardasare (1816, Suceava – 1900, Iași) was a Romanian painter.

External links 
 Brief Bio (in Romanian)

1816 births
1900 deaths
19th-century Romanian people
19th-century Romanian painters
People from Suceava